Havana, from on High is a Canadian documentary film, directed by Pedro Ruiz and released in 2019. The film profiles a group of people in Havana, Cuba who have responded to that city's housing crisis by living on the rooftops of buildings.

The film premiered on February 22, 2019 at the Rendez-vous Québec Cinéma.

Ruiz won the Canadian Screen Award for Best Cinematography in a Documentary at the 8th Canadian Screen Awards in 2020. The film received two Prix Iris nominations at the 22nd Quebec Cinema Awards, for Best Cinematography in a Documentary (Ruiz) and Best Sound in a Documentary (René Portillo).

References

External links
 

2019 films
2019 documentary films
Canadian documentary films
Quebec films
Films shot in Havana
Documentary films about Cuba
Spanish-language Canadian films
2010s Canadian films